The  is a rapid transit line serving Yokohama in Kanagawa Prefecture, Japan. Unlike most metro lines in Japan, it uses third rail for power instead of overhead lines. It is the most recent rapid transit line in Japan to do so.

Local and rapid services operate continuously on both lines 1 and 3 as a single service.

Following the opening of the Green Line on 30 March 2008, the line was nicknamed the "Blue Line". The line color is blue and the line symbol used in the station numbering is B.

Operations

Rapid 
Rapid trains stop at all stations from Shonandai to Totsuka, and from Nippa to Azamino. Between Totsuka and Nippa, they only stop at Kaminagaya, Kamiooka, Kannai, Sakuragicho, Yokohama, and Shin-Yokohama. Essentially, rapid trains stop at only interchange stations and Kaminagaya in this section.

Rapid services began operating on 18 July 2015.

Local 
During the daytime, there are two trains that direct the Shonandai station-Azamino station between 30 minutes, Odoriba Station-Azamino station and the Shonandai station-Nippa station, each of which is operated by one.

About the interval train to the Odoriba station is usually the meeting of the fast at the Kaminagaya station, usually at the Nippa station departure and take the rapid connection with the Nippa station of the first train terminal. There are a lot of Azamino trains which depart from the Nippa station and Kaminagaya station with the garage mainly in the early morning and midnight although the whole train becomes usual time zone excluding daytime, and many trains drive directly between the station-Shonandai station.

Moreover, there is one connected to Shonandai at the Kaminagaya station on the end of the terminal by the train which goes to Kaminagaya on a weekday, six on a Saturday holiday, and the Azamino departure. Although Blue is mainly used in the direction curtain display of the vehicle and the guidance of the station campus, it is not necessarily united in case of green.

Station list 
 Local trains stop at all stations.
 Rapid trains stop at stations marked "●" and pass those marked "|".

Rolling stock
 3000 series 37 × six-car EMUs (since 1992)

, the line is operated using a fleet of 37 six-car 3000 series EMUs based at Kaminagaya Depot. The fleet is subdivided into eight first-batch 3000A series sets (numbered 24 to 31), seven-second-batch 3000N series sets (numbered 32 to 38), fourteen third-batch 3000R series sets (numbered 39 to 52), and eight fourth-batch 3000S series sets (numbered 53 to 60).

A fifth-batch 3000V series six-car set entered service on the line on 9 April 2017.

 4000 series 8 × EMUs (to be introduced from 2022)

The 4000 series began appearing in service on 2 May 2022.

Former 
 1000 series 14 × 6-car EMUs (from December 1972 until November 2006)
 2000 series 9 × 6-car EMUs (from 1984 until November 2006)

History 

In 1965, construction of Line 1 and Line 3 began.

Line 1 would be extended by one station to Totsuka (a distance of ) on 27 August 1989; a temporary station was in operation at that location from 24 May 1987 until that date. The most recent extension of Line 3, a  section from Shin-Yokohama to Azamino opened on 18 March 1993. The final  section of Line 1 from Totsuka to Shōnandai opened on 28 August 1999.

From July 2015, limited-stop "Rapid" services were introduced on the line, with approximately two services operating per hour during the daytime off-peak. Journey times over the entire length of the line were reduced by up to 10 minutes from the 1 hour 7 minutes taken by all-stations services. From 4 March 2017, the intervals between rapid trains was decreased to 20 minutes.

On 21 January 2020, Yokohama City and Kawasaki City announced the route and four new stations for the planned 6.5 km extension from Azamino to Shin-Yurigaoka Station on the Odakyū Odawara Line. Construction of this section is expected to complete by 2030.  In June 2020, the Transportation Bureau started environmental impact asssesment procedures of the extension project.

References

External links 
 

Yokohama Municipal Subway
Lines of Yokohama City Transportation Bureau
 
1972 establishments in Japan
750 V DC railway electrification